Suite 7 is an American limited anthology series created and executive produced by Wilson Cleveland. who also stars as Matthew Brandon. The series, presented by Better Sleep Council and distributed by A&E Networks, debuted on December 17, 2010 on MyLifetime.com and Lifetime’s Hulu, YouTube, iTunes and Xbox channels.

Premise 
The series is set inside a single suite of a fictional hotel located in Valencia, California outside Los Angeles. Each episode tells a standalone story from different writers and directors that focus on the relationship between two characters. Some episodes are comedic and others are more dramatic. Wilson Cleveland plays Matthew, the hotel manager and main character in the frame story, who interacts with the eclectic guests who check in throughout the series.

Reception 
Suite 7 received 200,000 streams in its first two weeks of release and received generally favorable reviews from critics. 

In his January 14, 2011 New York Times review, critic Mike Hale wrote Suite 7 was “worth checking out,” singling out the episode ‘’Good in Bed’’ starring Jaime Murray and Eddie McClintock as a divorcing couple as “the best so far.” Jim Edwards of CBS News called Shannen Doherty’s performance “jarringly emotional” and observed that series stars Illeana Douglas, Milo Ventimiglia and Brian Austin Green “seem to be having a ball and delivering performances of a far higher quality than they have often done on regular TV.” GigaOm writer Liz Shannon Miller wrote in her January 5, 2011 review, “There’s a theatrical feel to the bulk of the series, which is one way of saying that the plotting feels a little slight at times, with many episodes representing nice illustrations of scene work as opposed to engaging storytelling.”

The International Academy of Digital Arts and Sciences honored Shannen Doherty and Wilson Cleveland with a 2012 Webby Award for Individual Performance and the series was nominated for Best Online Program - Drama at the 2011 Banff World Media Festival.

Episodes

References

External links

 
 
 
 

2010s American drama television series
2010s American anthology television series
English-language television shows